Jessica Clark (born 21 April 1985) is a British model and actress.

Early life and education
Clark grew up in London; she is of Irish, Indian, and Nigerian descent. At 16, she won a national modeling competition, and signed with Models 1. Choosing initially to combine modeling with her studies, Clark attended the London School of Economics as a law undergraduate with the intention of pursuing a law career. However, the success of her modeling career led her to leave the program after 18 months, and move first to Paris and then a year later to New York City.

Career
Clark is signed with Marilyn NY Agency. Clark has worked with clients such as Hermes, Redken, and L’Oreal. She has also appeared in magazines such as Vogue, Vogue India, Elle, Marie Claire, and Jalouse. She has walked the runway for designers such as Hermes, Bottega Veneta, and Matthew Williamson.

While living in New York City, Clark had trained as an actress, and in 2011 relocated to Los Angeles where she has appeared in TV and independent film. Clark had a central role in the feature film A Perfect Ending, a 2012 lesbian film directed by Nicole Conn. She played the vampire goddess Lilith in True Blood. In 2015, she had a central role in the satirical thriller Pocket Listing.

Personal life
Clark is openly lesbian. She is one of the hosts of the Vlog Lesbian love, at afterellen.com. She married fitness professional Lacey Stone in 2010, but the couple divorced in 2012.

Filmography

Awards 
Clark is the recipient of a New Now Next Award (2009) in the category "Cause You're Hot".

References

External links

1985 births
Living people
21st-century English actresses
Actresses from London
British actresses of Indian descent
Alumni of the London School of Economics
British people of Irish descent
English people of Nigerian descent
English people of Irish descent
English people of Indian descent
English lesbian actresses
Lesbian models
British video bloggers
British women bloggers